The knockout stage of the 25th Arabian Gulf Cup is the second and final stage of the 25th Arabian Gulf Cup, following the group stage. It was played from 16 to 19 January 2023. The top two teams from each group (four in total) advanced to the knockout stage to compete in a single-legged single-elimination tournament beginning with the semi-finals followed by the final.

Qualified teams
The top two highest-placing teams from each of the two groups advanced to the knockout stage.

Schedule
The schedule of each round is as follows.

Format 
All ties will be single-legged. If the score is level at the end of normal time, extra time will be played, and if the score remains level, the match will be decided by a penalty shoot-out.

Bracket

Semi-finals

|}

Iraq vs Qatar

Bahrain vs Oman

Final

References

Knockout stage